Mikhail Kravchuk (born 19 September 1991) is a Belarusian former professional football player.

External links
 
 

1991 births
Living people
Belarusian footballers
Association football midfielders
FC Bereza-2010 players
FC Luch Minsk (2012) players
FC Orsha players
FC Naftan Novopolotsk players
FC Oshmyany players
FC Uzda players